Adriana María "Tuti" Tirado Ortiz (born 6 October 1998) is a Puerto Rican footballer who plays as a midfielder, lastly for Gokulam Kerala of the Indian Women's League and the Puerto Rico women's national team.

International goals
Scores and results list Puerto Rico's goal tally first.

Honors
Gokulam Kerala
AFC Women's Club Championship: third place 2021

References

External links

1998 births
Living people
Women's association football midfielders
Puerto Rican women's footballers
Sportspeople from San Juan, Puerto Rico
Puerto Rico women's international footballers
College women's soccer players in the United States
New Mexico State Aggies athletes
Gokulam Kerala FC Women players
Saint Leo University alumni
Women's Premier Soccer League players
Puerto Rican expatriate women's footballers
Expatriate women's footballers in India
21st-century American women